Zhang Zongyi (16 March 1924 – 31 January 2014), better known by his stage name Liu Ling Tong (literally: "Six Year Old Child") and famously known as "Nan Hou Wang" (literally: "Southern Monkey King"), was a Chinese Shao opera actor and artist best known for his role as the Monkey King (Sun Wukong) in Shao opera. He was president of the Zhejiang Shao Opera Theatre and a member of special government allowances of the State Council of Experts. He was a member of the 5th, 6th, 7th and 8th National Committee of the Chinese People's Political Consultative Conference.

Biography
Zhang was born on March 16, 1924, in Shangyu District of Shaoxing, Zhejiang in a family of performing artists. His grandfather, Zhang Tingchun, mostly performed in the countryside of Zhejiang under the stage name "Huo Hou Zhang". Zhang's father, Zhang Yisheng with the stage name "Sai Huo Hou" (literally: "Better than a living monkey"). His elder brother, Zhang Zongxin, who specialised in playing Zhu Bajie, had the stage name "Qi Ling Tong" (literally: "Seven Year Old Child").

Zhang began his acting career at age 6 and made his acting debut at age 12.

After the founding of the Communist State, he was appointed president of the Zhejiang Shao Opera Troupe. In August 1956, Zhang performed The Monkey King caused havoc in Heaven for Vice Premier Chen Yi and Indonesian President Sukarno. On December 17, 1957, he performed The Monkey King caused havoc in Heaven again for Premier Zhou Enlai and Soviet guests at Shanghai Sino - Soviet Friendship Mansion. In 1961, he performed The Monkey King Thrice Defeats the Skeleton Demon for Mao Zedong, his performance was acclaimed by Mao. It was filmed as a color drama film, released in 72 countries and regions.

In 1966, Mao Zedong launched the Cultural Revolution, Zhang was labeled as a rightist, a capitalist roader, a reactionary scholar and a counter-revolutionary revisionist. The Red Guards 
took him into custody and put him under investigation. They paraded him through the streets and beat him in public. Finally, he was sent to countryside to a labour camp. In the fall of 1971, Mao Zedong toured in southern China and ordered him to be released. In 1974, Zhang returned to the public stage, he earned an Outstanding Performance Award in the 1st Zhejiang Drama Festival for his performance as Sun Wukong in The Flaming Mountain.

On January 31, 2014, he died of illness in Shaoxing, Zhejiang.

Drama work
 Sun Wukong in Pingdingshan
 The Monkey King Thrice Defeats the Skeleton Demon
 The Flaming Mountain
 The Monkey King caused havoc in Heaven

Book

Personal life
Zhang had eleven sons. Zhang Jinlai, better known by his stage name Liu Xiao Ling Tong (literally: "Little Six Year Old Child"), and Zhang Jinxing (1959 - 1966), better known by his stage name "Xiao Liu Ling Tong" (literally: "Little Six Year Old Child", or "Six Year Old Child, Junior").

References

External links
 六小龄童之父六龄童 揭示家族四代人的“猴王”历史 Sohu 

1924 births
Politicians from Shaoxing
2014 deaths
Male actors from Shaoxing
People's Republic of China politicians from Zhejiang
Singers from Zhejiang
20th-century Chinese  male singers
20th-century Chinese male actors
Male Chinese opera actors